Ambroise Louis Garneray  (19 February 1783 – 11 September 1857) was a French corsair, painter and writer. He served under Robert Surcouf and Jean-Marie Dutertre, and was held as prisoner-of-war by the British for eight years after being captured before being repatriated at the conclusion of the Napoleonic Wars, continuing his career as a painter until his death in 1857.

Biography

Early life 
Garneray was born in Paris (on Rue Saint-Andre-des-arts, in the Latin Quarter) on 19 February 1783. He was the elder son of Jean-François Garneray (1755–1837), painter of the king, who was pupil of Jacques-Louis David. At thirteen, he joined the Navy as a seaman, encouraged by his cousin, Beaulieu-Leloup, commander of the frigate Forte ("the Stout one"). Garneray sailed from Rochefort to the Indian Ocean with the frigate division under Sercey, to which the Forte belonged.

Garneray took part in the various campaigns of Sercey division and witnessed the hardship it met in the battle against Arrogant and Victorious. He then served in 1798 on the corvette Brûle Gueule ("Mouth burner"), which patrolled with the frigate Preneuse ("the Taker"). Returning from this campaign, the Brûle Gueule and Preneuse were chased by a British squadron comprising two ships of the line, one frigate and one corvette; the French flew into a creek near Rivière Noire District whose shallow waters prevented the British from pursuing. The next day, the British squadron attacked; the French had established strong defensive positions by installing the unusable batteries of their ships ashore, and repelled the British squadron.

In 1799, Garneray was promoted to quartermaster and "first painter of the edge" on the  Preneuse  under captain Jean-Marthe-Adrien l'Hermite. The frigate was the last French official force in the Indian Ocean. This patrol went into trouble, in spite of an exceptional combat against the British ship of the line the Jupiter. Returning to Mauritius, her crew suffered from scurvy, and the Preneuse had to be kept quarantined and had to return to the British forces making the blockade of the island. Garneray escaped captivity by regaining the coast with the stroke. In spite of the disaster, Garneray kept longstanding admiration and friendship for Lhermitte, whom he would continue to visit until his death 1826.

 For lack of official ships, Garneray joined the Confiance ("the Trust") of Robert Surcouf as an ensign, from April at December 1800. He took part in the capturing and boarding the Kent in October 1800. It was the only time where Garneray made money as a sailor. Upon returning from patrol, he invested his share in a slave trading ship, l'Union, on which he was a first mate.
 
He sailed on various trading ships during the peace of Amiens, after which he served aboard the  Pinson  ("the Finch"), a cutter based in Île Bourbon. He replaced the commander when he died, and was shipwrecked shortly thereafter. He then served on the corsair Tigre du Bengale and eventually on the frigate Atalante attached to the squadron of Linois. He later served on the Belle Poule ("beautiful chick"), and was aboard when she was captured by the British in March 1806. Wounded, Garneray was transported to England and spent the eight following years in prison hulks off Portsmouth (on the Protée, the Couronne ("Crown") Vengeance and Assistance. He was able to improve his standard of living by selling paintings to a British merchant.

A statement attributed to him goes: "But for piracy, I believe that I practiced about all kinds of navigation".

Life as a painter 
 
 
Released on 18 May 1814, Garneray did not find employment in the commercial navy and remained in Paris where he devoted himself to painting. Probably thanks to one of his brothers, himself painter and engraver and who knew people in the entourage of  Napoleon, he received his first official order: the meeting of l'Inconstant and the Zéphir, as an anecdote of the return from Elba. The work was carried out only  in 1834 as, because of the political climate of the Bourbon Restoration, he felt it more convenient to paint the Descent of the French emigrants at Quiberon, which was exhibited at the Salon de Paris in 1815. Garneray attended the salon every year from then.

Garneray came to be employed by the duke of Angoulême, then Grand Admiral of France, and became his appointed painter in 1817. He was in fact the first Peintre de la Marine ("official painter of the Navy"). Between 1821 and 1830, he went in many harbours of France where he made numerous sketches which were used as a basis for engravings or fabrics.

In 1833, he was made director of the museum of Rouen. He later joined the Manufacture nationale de Sèvres. In the 1830s he developed a new genre of painting, the aquatint, and also developed a major career of engraving. In the 1840s, his fame seems to have dimmed; he lost most of his political supporters and fell into poverty. By the time of Napoleon III, he took part in the failed coup d'état of Strasbourg. He experienced a short return of glory towards the beginning of the Second French Empire, as he was awarded the Legion of honour in 1852 by vice admiral Bergeret and the Emperor himself.

 
Developing a tremor which prevented him from writing and which complicated his work as a painter, he died in Paris in 1857, a few months only before his wife was mysteriously assassinated. Garneray was buried at the Montmartre cemetery: A close friend of his had the tombstone decorated with a painter's palette, a ship mast and the Legion of Honour.

Paintings 
The pictorial work of Garneray comprises 141 oil paintings, 176 engravings and 22 watercolour paintings. Part of his work was inspired by his adventurous life, such as the capture of Kent by Surcouf; others were made as peintre officiel de la Marine, in continuation of the works of Claude Joseph Vernet and Nicolas Ozanne. Most notably, he realised  64 sights of French harbours and 40 sights of foreign harbours (engravings), following the journeys he accomplished in the 1820s. Some of the paintings were given to the Paris Chamber of Commerce by the industrialist Meunier.

His two brothers Hippolyte and Auguste, like his sister Pauline, also practised painting to a lesser extent. That explains the variations of signatures (sometimes Garneray, sometimes Garnerey), which were to distinguish the painters of the family.

In literature 
Garneray's depictions were mentioned in Herman Melville's novel Moby-Dick:

{{cquote|But, taken for all in all, by far the finest, though in some details not the most correct, presentations of whales and whaling scenes to be anywhere found, are two large French engravings, well executed, and taken from paintings by one Garnery [sic]. Respectively, they represent attacks on the Sperm and Right Whale... }}

 Literary works by Garneray 
Garneray wrote epic depictions of his adventures, becoming one of the precursors of the maritime novel of adventure.

During his stay in Rouen, he published articles about his sailing and captivity days. He offered these texts to the Ministry of Education in 1847 "for edification of the youth", which politely rebuffed him. His posthumous celebrity stems from the fad of more or less apocryphal memoirs of combatants of Revolution and of Empire which became popular in the 1860s. Garneray's memoirs were published in three volumes as Voyages, Aventures et Combats,Mes Pontons, and Scenes Maritimes. They were probably partly rewritten by professional writers, notably Édouard Corbière, introducing spectacular but irrealistic elements:
 Lhermitte being poisoned in Mauritius, a thesis often repeated in biographies of Lhermitte; in fact, from 1798 until his death, he suffered from a tropical disease, probably an acute form of Malaria.
 the obfuscated story of Kernau's death
 Garneray being personally involved in incidents which he probably described without being an actor, like the shipwreck of the AmphitriteRichard Rose's detailed analysis of the materials used in the writing of Mes Pontons (The Floating Prison 2003, 2012) shows the general unreliability of Garneray as a writer of verifiable history. Hence, his memoirs are not now considered to be a serious historical source. However, Sentant fort le goudron and Mes Pontons do constitute testimonies of everyday life in the navy of the time.

Various versions were published as
  Corsaire de la République , Voyages, adventures and combat, Paris, Éditions Phébus, 1984; Rééd. Payot, 1991
  Le Négrier de Zanzibar , Voyages, adventures and combat, Paris, Phébus, 1985; Rééd. Payot, 1992
  Un Corsaire au bagne. Mes pontons , Paris, Phébus, 1985; Rééd. Payot, 1992
  Un Corsaire de quinze ans ,
  Un Marin de Surcouf   Les Naufragés du Saint Antoine  The Floating Prison (translated by Richard Rose) Conway Maritime Press, 2003.
 The Floating Prison (revised e-book version, translated by Richard Rose) Otterquill Books, 2012.

 References 

 Laurent Manoeuvre, Louis Garneray, peintre, écrivain, aventurier '', Anthèse editions, 1997

1783 births
1857 deaths
19th-century French painters
19th-century French writers
19th-century sailors
French male painters
19th-century French male writers
French marine artists
French prisoners of war in the Napoleonic Wars
Napoleonic Wars prisoners of war held by the United Kingdom
French privateers
Burials at Montmartre Cemetery
19th-century French memoirists